João Nílson Zunino commonly known as Zunino (9 April 1946 – 23 December 2014) was the president of Avaí Futebol Clube from 2002 until 2013, succeeding Flávio Ricardo Félix. He was also a cardiology doctor and a businessman. He was born in São João Batista, Brazil. Zunino died on 23 December 2014 in Florianópolis.

References

1946 births
2014 deaths
Brazilian football chairmen and investors
Avaí FC
Brazilian cardiologists
People from Santa Catarina (state)